Motahar Hossain may refer to:
 Motahar Hossain (Bangladeshi politician)
 Motahar Hossain (Indian politician) (1932-2011)
 Qazi Motahar Hossain (1897-1981), Bangladeshi author, scientist, statistician, chess player, and journalist